Anthony Jorm (born 1951) is an Australian researcher who has made contributions in the areas of psychology, psychiatry and gerontology. He also co-founded mental health first aid training with mental health educator Betty Kitchener.

Career
Anthony Jorm received a BA from the University of Queensland, achieving First Class Honours in psychology and a University Medal in 1973. He then completed a master's degree in clinical psychology (1975) and a PhD in psychology (1977) at the University of New South Wales. In 1995, he was awarded a DSc by the Australian National University for his research on mental disorders.
He has held academic appointments at Deakin University (1977-1984), the Australian National University (1984-2005), including Director of the Centre for Mental Health Research (2001-2004), and the University of Melbourne (2005-2018). Since 2019, he has been a Professor Emeritus at the University of Melbourne.  
Jorm has held National Health and Medical Research Council (NHMRC) Fellowships, including being awarded an Australia Fellowship in 2009. He is currently an NHMRC Leadership Fellow.

Honorary positions include president of the Australasian Society for Psychiatric Research (1999–2000), chair of the Board of Mental Health First Aid International, and chair of the Australian Rotary Health Research Committee (2009–2012).

Contributions to research
Jorm's early research at Deakin University was on cognitive processes in reading and spelling, particularly on reading and spelling disabilities. This work examined the role of problems in storage and retrieval of phonological information from long-term memory, as well as the influence of the home and school environment, on reading achievement.

At the Australian National University, he worked with A. S. (Scott) Henderson on the epidemiology of dementia and depression. This research included “integrated analyses of published work; instrument development; cross-sectional and prospective longitudinal surveys of cognitive decline, dementia and depression in general population samples; and a case-control study of Alzheimer’s disease”. This research included studies showing history of depression as a risk factor for dementia.  Measures were developed for the assessment of dementia including the Informant Questionnaire on Cognitive Decline in the Elderly (IQCODE) and the Psychogeriatric Assessment Scales.

In the mid-1990s, Jorm began research on mental health literacy, introducing this term and carrying out a national survey of the mental health literacy of the Australian public. An article on this work was listed as the 5th most-cited article in the 100-year history of the Medical Journal of Australia. The research on mental health literacy was a major influence on the development of Mental health first aid training. Jorm's current research at the University of Melbourne is on building the community's capacity for prevention and early intervention on mental disorders.

Jorm has been listed as one of the most cited researchers in the mental health field in Australia and the world. In 2020, he was ranked in the top 500 most-cited scientists in the world across all scientific disciplines.

Role in Mental Health First Aid
In 2000, Jorm was a founder of Mental Health First Aid training, together with his wife Betty Kitchener. He led research to evaluate the effects of Mental Health First Aid training and guidelines on how to give mental health first aid for a range of developing mental health problems and mental health crises. In 2011, together with Betty Kitchener, he founded the not-for-profit organization Mental Health First Aid International and was the inaugural Chair of its Board. By 2021, Mental Health First Aid training had spread to over 25 countries and over 4 million people had been trained globally.

Editorial roles
He was the Editor-in-Chief of the Australasian Journal on Ageing from 1997 to 2001 and has been the Editor-in-Chief of Mental Health & Prevention since 2019. He was an Associate Editor of the Australian and New Zealand Journal of Psychiatry from 2005 to 2021 and an Associate Editor of Early Intervention in Psychiatry from 2006 to 2013.

Awards and honours
 University of Queensland Medal, 1973
 Guy Goodricke Prize in Psychology
 Australian Psychological Society Early Career Award, 1982
 Fellow of the Academy of Social Sciences in Australia, 1994
 Ewald W Busse Research Award from the International Association of Gerontology, 1997
 Founders’ Medal, Australasian Society for Psychiatric Research, 2002
 ISI Highly Cited Researcher, 2003
 Australian Rotary Health Medal, 2007
 Thompson Scientific Citation Award, 2008
 Excellence in Mental Health Education, National Council of Behavioral Healthcare, USA, 2008. 
 National Health and Medical Research Council Australia Fellow, 2009
 Outstanding Academic Mentor Award, Australian Psychological Society, 2017

Personal life
Jorm married Betty Kitchener in 1978 and they have two children. He is a keen cyclist. He is a member of the Rotary Club of Carlton.

References

Living people
1951 births
Academic staff of Deakin University
Academic staff of the Australian National University
Academic staff of the University of Melbourne
Australian psychologists